The Chippewa Falls and Western Railway was incorporated in 1873 and was sold in 1884 to the Minnesota, Saint Croix and Wisconsin Railroad, which merged into the Wisconsin Central Company later that year.

References 

Defunct Wisconsin railroads
Predecessors of the Minneapolis, St. Paul and Sault Ste. Marie Railroad
Railway companies established in 1873
Railway companies disestablished in 1884